Really Big Things is a series about massive man-made marvels like big machines, giant telescopes, skyscrapers and other massive structures. It airs on the Discovery Channel, HD Theater and Science Channel.
It is now being aired on the UK version of the Discovery Channel in the early slot of 04:40am

Matt Rogers presents the show in a semi-comedy fashion, often giving the viewers the impression he is a maverick with little regard for common sense, although when faced with true danger, such as standing by a dumper truck tipping and cutting the restraining wires on a concrete mat in Season 1, he will "hand over to the professionals" or remove himself from danger.

Episode list

Season 1

External links
 , Discovery Channel
 , tv.com

Discovery Channel original programming
2000s American reality television series
2007 American television series debuts